Aussie Gold is a television programme on Foxtel's The Comedy Channel, created and executive produced by Darren Chau, produced by Anthony Warrington, and hosted by Australian comedian Frank Woodley. The show hosts a programming block celebrating the very best in Australian comedy. The weekly programme has also featured special editions such as ANZAC Gold and the 20th Anniversary celebrations of Fast Forward.

An Aussie Gold promo starring Peter Helliar won Silver at the 2011 Australian Promax Awards.

Featured programming
 The Comedy Company
 Jimeoin
 Big Girl's Blouse
 Blankety Blanks
 Fast Forward
 Kingswood Country
 The Adventures of Lano and Woodley
 We Can Be Heroes: Finding The Australian of the Year
 The Norman Gunston Show
 The Games
 Mother and Son

References

External links
 

Television programming blocks in Australia
Australian comedy television series
The Comedy Channel original programming
2008 Australian television series debuts